Armed And Dangerous is the debut EP release by Canadian speed/thrash metal band Razor, released in 1984. This EP was limited to 1,200 copies on vinyl and is very rare.

Track listing

Notes 
 The 2010 bootlegged limited edition colored vinyl by Razor Edge Records was hand numbered, limited to 550 copies. It was issued on black, white, clear, green and red vinyl with unknown delineation. It also has a three-way opening cover. Despite the center labels confirming the playing speed at 33 1/3 RPM, the record actually plays at 45 RPM
 Bootlegged as a picture disc LP in 2006 by Metalized Blood Records, limited 300 copies
 The 35th anniversary limited edition vinyl (limited to 1,000 copies) and CD editions by High Roller Records contain demo recordings

Personnel 
 Stace McLaren - vocals
 Dave Carlo - guitars
 Mike Campagnolo - bass
 Mike Embro - drums

Production 
 Dave Carlo - Cover concept
 Dana Marostega - Logo design, Photography
 Terry Marostega - Producer

References

Razor (band) albums
1984 EPs

fr:Razor (groupe)#Discographie